Southville City is a township in Dengkil, Sepang District , Selangor, Malaysia. This township is located about 25 km from Kuala Lumpur city centre and near to Bangi. The township is developed by Mah Seng Group.

Townships in Selangor